Jens Henrik Peder Arnold Malling (11 April 1909 – 25 January 1969) was a Swedish diplomat. After finishing his university studies, Malling became an attaché at the Ministry for Foreign Affairs in 1938. He then served within the Swedish foreign service for over 30 years.

Early life
Malling was born on 11 April 1909 in Stockholm, Sweden, the son of lieutenant colonel Henrik Malling and his wife Ingrid (née Asklund). He passed studentexamen in Lund in 1928 and received a Bachelor of Arts in 1932, a Politices Magister (MA in political science) degree in 1938 and a Candidate of Law degree in 1938.

Career
Malling became an attaché at the Ministry for Foreign Affairs in 1938 and served in Rome the same year and in Chicago in 1939 and in Washington, D.C. in 1940. Malling was acting second vice consul in New York City in 1943 and second secretary at the Foreign Ministry in Stockholm in 1944.

Malling was first vice consul in Hamburg in 1946 and first legation secretary and acting chargé d’affaires in Vienna in 1946. He served as first secretary at the Foreign Ministry in Stockholm in 1948 and was secretary in the Committee on Foreign Affairs in 1950. Malling was then legation counselor and chargé d’affaires in Tel Aviv in 1953 and mediator at the Neutral Nations Supervisory Commission in Korea in 1955.

Malling was appointed envoy in Tel Aviv in 1956 and was ambassador in Jakarta and non-resident ambassador in Manila from 1956 to 1959 as well as non-resident ambassador in Kuala Lumpur from 1958 to 1959. He was then minister at the UN delegation in New York City in 1959 and resident at the representation of UN's technical assistance operations in Iraq from 1959 to 1961. Malling succeeded Carl Douglas as ambassador in Rio de Janeiro in 1961 after Douglas had died in a car accident there on 21 January. He became honorary chairman of the Swedish-Brazilian Chamber of Commerce in 1961. Malling stayed as ambassador there until 1965 before becoming ambassador in The Hague in 1966.

Death
Malling died on 25 January 1969 in a hospital in The Hague. He had surgery for a thrombosis and complications arose after the procedure. Malling was interred at the Northern Cemetery in Lund on 22 March 1969.

Malling had been described by Jan Mårtenson as being a "chubby, white-haired and blue-eyed bachelor, jovial and humorous, a little of an aging cherub".

Awards and decorations
  Knight of the Order of the Polar Star
 Commander of the Order of Merit of Argentina (Orden Al Mérito)
  Commander of the Order of the Southern Cross
  Commander of the Order of St. Olav (1 July 1953)
  Second Class of the Order of the Star of Italian Solidarity
  Officer of the Order of Civil Merit
  Knight of the Order of the Aztec Eagle

References

1909 births
1969 deaths
Ambassadors of Sweden to Israel
Ambassadors of Sweden to Indonesia
Ambassadors of Sweden to the Philippines
Ambassadors of Sweden to Malaysia
Ambassadors of Sweden to Brazil
Ambassadors of Sweden to the Netherlands
People from Stockholm
Knights of the Order of the Polar Star